Sinkov may refer to:

Abraham Sinkov, an American cryptanalyst
Sinkov, Ukraine, a settlement in Ternopil Oblast, Ukraine
Anatoli Sinkov (artillerist),  Hero of the Soviet Union (1945)
Anatoli Sinkov (pilot),  Hero of the Soviet Union (1944), later stripped of the award